Yann Lionel Mayangui Samba (born 20 January 1999) is a French footballer who plays as a defender for Turbina.

Career

As a youth player, Samba joined the youth academy of French lower league side Épinal after almost joining the youth academy of Virton in Belgium. After that, he trialed for French Ligue 1 club Toulouse.

In 2018, Samba signed for Foresta Suceava in the Romanian third division. After that, he signed for Bulgarian third division team Sevlievo, where he stated "In Bulgaria, football is very physical, very rough football. All things considered, it can be compared to England. It reminds me of this type of game, very physical and very athletic. After Bulgarian football is not very tactical but there are many very technical players. Also, the championship is improving year by year.
On the other hand, in terms of atmospheres, they are great big football fans. I have played many matches with a lot of supporters. There are ultras there and it sure sets the mood in the stadium. For me who had never known that before, it feels a bit weird but that's also why we play football, to play in atmospheres like that."

Before the second half of 2019/20, Samba signed for Spartak (Varna) in the Bulgarian second division.

Before the second half of 2020/21, he signed for Albanian top flight outfit Bylis.

In 2021, he signed for Turbina in the Albanian second division.

Career statistics

References

External links
 
 

French sportspeople of Republic of the Congo descent
French footballers
KF Turbina players
KF Bylis players
Kategoria e Parë players
FC Spartak Varna players
Second Professional Football League (Bulgaria) players
French expatriate sportspeople in Bulgaria
1999 births
Association football defenders
French expatriate sportspeople in Romania
French expatriate sportspeople in Albania
Expatriate footballers in Albania
Expatriate footballers in Romania
French expatriate footballers
Living people
Expatriate footballers in Bulgaria
Sportspeople from Brazzaville